is the last single recorded by Japanese enka singer Hibari Misora, as she died soon after its release in 1989. It was composed by Akira Mitake, with lyrics by Yasushi Akimoto. It was voted the greatest Japanese song of all time during a national poll in 1997 by NHK, with more than 10 million votes. It is often the song of choice for artists performing live tributes to Misora.

External links
 

Enka songs
Japanese songs
Japanese-language songs
1989 singles
Songs about rivers
Songs with lyrics by Yasushi Akimoto
1989 songs